Neena Gupta is an Indian actress and television director who works in Hindi films and television. She has received several awards including two National Film Awards, three Filmfare Awards and two Screen Awards.

Known for her work in both art-house and commercial films, she won the National Film Award for Best Supporting Actress for playing a young widow in Woh Chokri (1994). In 2018, she saw career resurgence for starring as a middle-aged pregnant woman in the comedy-drama Badhaai Ho, for which she won the Filmfare Award for Best Actress (Critics) and received a nomination for the Filmfare Award for Best Actress.

Gupta's television appearances include a leading role in the drama series Saans (1999) and as the host of the Indian version of the television quiz show The Weakest Link, named Kamzor Kadii Kaun. In June 2021, publisher Penguin Random House India released her autobiography Sach Kahun Toh.

Early life and education
Neena Gupta was born in Calcutta, India to R. N. Gupta, an LLB and an officer in the State Trading Corporation of India, and Shakuntala Devi, née Kinra, a former teacher with double masters degrees in Sanskrit and Political Science. 

She grew up in the Karol Bagh area of New Delhi, doing her elementary schooling at the Bal Bharti School and secondary schooling at Vidya Bhawan. She went on to do a BA from Janki Devi Mahavidyalaya , and MA in Sanskrit from Delhi University. She also earned an MPhil from the same University for her thesis on ‘Stage Techniques in Sanskrit Drama: Theory and Practice’. Midway through her PhD in Sanskrit, she gave up her research due to difference of opinion between her guide and her.

She was active in the theatre scene while at University, forming a close friendship with fellow actor-director Satish Kaushik, who encouraged her to follow his lead and join the National School of Drama. Gupta enrolled at NSD in 1977, studying under the tutelage of such greats as Ebrahim Alkazi and B.V. Karanth and graduated top of her class in 1980. Her contemporaries at the institute include Alok Nath and Annu Kapoor.

Career

Film career
Gupta has made appearances in several international films, such as Gandhi (1982), in which she played the niece of Mahatma Gandhi, and Merchant Ivory films, The Deceivers (1988), Mirza Ghalib (1989), In Custody (1993), and Cotton Mary (1999). She also made an impression in Indian parallel cinema such as Mandi (1983), Rihaee (1988), Drishti (1990) and Suraj Ka Satvan Ghoda (1992). These performances further established her profile in Indian movies alongside her arthouse film contemporaries Rekha, Shabana Azmi, Smita Patil and Dimple Kapadia. Despite this, Gupta never had a major commercial hit and found it difficult to find more dramatic roles:

Her appearance in Hindi movies was especially noted in the satirical movie, Jaane Bhi Do Yaaro in which she played the role of a secretary to Pankaj Kapoor. She also starred along with Madhuri Dixit in Khalnayak (1993); she was featured in the popular song "Choli Ke Peeche" in the movie. She has made television movies, Lajwanti and Bazar Sitaram (1993), which won the 1993 National Film Award for Best First Non-Feature Film. In 1994, Gupta's breakthrough came in the acclaimed drama Woh Chokri as a recently widowed daughter-in-law; this performance won her a National Film Award for Best Supporting Actress.

In 2017, Gupta made headlines when she shared a post on Instagram asking for work: "I live in Mumbai and working as a good actor looking for good parts to play." Fed up with the lack of roles being written for middle-aged women in Bollywood, Gupta later reflected, "After that Instagram post, I got many offers -- five, in fact, and I accepted all of them. There is no shame in saying you don't have work." One of the offers she accepted was Amit Sharma's comedy-drama Badhaai Ho (2018), which emerged as the ninth highest-grossing Bollywood film of 2018. Her performance as a middle-aged pregnant mother earned widespread critical acclaim, with various critics and publications citing her performance as the film's highlight and one of the best of her career. Rajeev Masand credited Gupta for bringing "real empathy" to the part, while Saibal Chatterjee of NDTV described her portrayal as "outstandingly measured." Acting opposite Ayushmann Khurana as her son, Gupta received various accolades for her performance including the Filmfare Critics Award for Best Actress, the Screen Award for Best Actress (Critics), and the BFJA Award for Best Supporting Actor - Female. At 60, she became the second-eldest Best Actress nominee in Filmfare Award history after Sharmila Tagore.

In 2020, Gupta appeared in Ashwiny Iyer Tiwari's sports comedy-drama Panga, and has reunited with Ayushmann Khurana for Shubh Mangal Zyada Saavdhan, with the latter earning her a Filmfare Award nomination for Best Supporting Actress. Neena Gupta appeared alongside Manoj Bajpayee and Sakshi Tanwar in the thriller 'Dial 100'.

Television career
Her big break on television came with Khandaan (1985), Yatra (1986), Gulzar's Mirza Ghalib (1987), a TV miniseries, followed by Shyam Benegal's Bharat Ek Khoj (1988) and later Dard (1994), Gumraah (1995), Shrimaan Shrimati (1995), Saans, Saat Phere: Saloni Ka Safar (2005), Chitthi (2003), Meri Biwi Ka Jawab Nahin (2004). She has also acted in the TV serial, Buniyaad.

She also hosted the Indian version of the TV series The Weakest Link, Kamzor Kadii Kaun and appeared in Jassi Jaissi Koi Nahin which gave her considerable popularity.

She has directed successful TV series, such as Saans (1999), Siski in (2000) and Kyun Hota Hai Pyarrr. She played the role of Shubha, one of the four women main leads in Ladies Special, a daily soap on Sony TV. She is now seen in Dil se Diya Vachan as a doctor by profession and mother-in-law of the lead character Nandani which airs on Zee TV

She also ran a theatre production company, 'Sahaj Productions' with actor, Rajendra Gupta, and acted as well as produced the Hindi play Soorya Ki Antim Kiran Se Soorya Ki Paheli Kiran Tak. She has also had some roles in Rishtey which was aired on Zee TV during 1999–2000.

She made an appearance in Amazon Prime's Panchayat as Manju Devi Pradhan. She appeared in season 2 of the same in 2022 as the same character.

She has also been a part of Masaba Masaba, a Netflix show based on her and her daughter Masaba Gupta, who is a designer by profession.

Personal life

Gupta married Amlan Kusum Ghose, studying at IIT-Delhi, while still a bachelor's student. The marriage was short-lived with both mutually and amicably deciding to part ways within a year. She was briefly engaged to Shaarangdev, the son of Pandit Jasraj. She was in a relationship with former West Indies cricketer Vivian Richards in the late 1980s. Though they never married, they have a daughter named Masaba Gupta born in 1989. Since Richards was already married, Gupta decided to raise Masaba on her own as a single mother.  In 2008, Gupta married New Delhi-based chartered accountant Vivek Mehra in a private ceremony in the United States.

Filmography

Films

Television

Awards and nominations

References

External links

 
 
 

Living people
Year of birth missing (living people)
National School of Drama alumni
Indian film actresses
Indian television actresses
Hindi-language film directors
Indian women television directors
Indian television directors
Indian women television producers
Indian television producers
Lawrence School, Sanawar alumni
Actresses in Malayalam cinema
Best Supporting Actress National Film Award winners
20th-century Indian actresses
21st-century Indian actresses
Actresses in Hindi television
Women television producers
Filmfare Awards winners
Screen Awards winners